Tran Van Soai (1889–1961), also known as Nam Lua, was a Vietnamese general and the commander-in-chief of the armed forces of the Hòa Hảo.

Born in Southern Vietnam into peasantry, he initially worked as a bus driver and became a gang leader. He converted to Hòa Hảo during World War II, and then quickly rose to prominence as the sect's leading military leader. He fought against the Japanese and Viet Minh during World War II and the First Indochina War. His forces then struggled against the South Vietnamese leader Ngô Đình Diệm in the 1950s, during the Vietnam War.

Life

Early years 
Trần Văn Soái was born in Long Xuyên in 1889. He then settled in Cái Vồn of Cần Thơ, a province in Southern Vietnam. He began his career as an uneducated peasant, working as a mechanic on ships that sailed the Bassac River, then as a ticket collector for a bus company, and finally as a bus driver. He eventually moved up to become the owner of a bus service that operated between Trà Ôn and Cần Thơ. During this period, Soai was the leader of his own gang of bus drivers. In a struggle with a rival gang boss in 1940, he was seriously injured and had to give up his job.

Hòa Hảo 
Around this time, he converted to Hòa Hảo, founded by Huỳnh Phú Sổ, and devoted his significant energies to advancing thorough the ranks of the sect. His third wife, Le thi Gam, took over his financial interests as well as management of his bus firm. He became the sect's leading military leader during World War II.

On 7–9 September 1945, a band of 15,000 Hoahaoists armed with hand-to-hand weapons, and aided by the Trotskyists, attacked the Việt Minh garrison at the port city of Cần Thơ, which the Hòa Hảo considered the rightful capital of their domain. They were led by Soái, his eldest son, Lâm Thành Nguyên, and Sổ's younger brother, but with their antiquated weapons, the Hòa Hảo were defeated and Sổ's men were massacred by the Việt Minh-controlled Advanced Guard Youth, who were reportedly aided by a nearby Japanese garrison. The slaughter was characterized by its savagery. After Sổ's death, Soái assumed the title of commander in chief of the Hòa Hảo armed forces.

During the 1950s, the new authority in Saigon, led by Ngô Đình Diệm, desired to relinquish the Hòa Hảo autonomy. Diệm demanded that Soái hand over control of his administrative region to the Saigon government. Soái refused this, and Diệm dispatched the Vietnamese National Army (VNA) to the region and threatened to level Soái's headquarters if the Hòa Hảo forces resisted. Nevertheless, the Diệm government paid $3 million for Soái's loyalty.

As the VNA wiped out most of Bình Xuyên's forces, an independent military force within the army, Soái, along with other Hòa Hảo generals, declared war on Saigon government in late May 1955, furious that they were not granted enough privileges. They knew that a direct confrontation with the VNA would be catastrophic, so they burned down to their bases and dispersed their army of 16,000 men into the jungle to operate as guerrillas. The Americans did not discourage Diệm from fighting back this time. The VNA, led by the General Dương Văn Minh, went on an offensive on 5 June and by mid-June, the army crushed Soái's forces near the Cambodian border, forcing him to retreat into Cambodia. Two other generals surrendered and another general, Ba Cụt, was arrested and beheaded in front of the public after being convicted of a series of murders in court.

He resigned in 1956, and died in Saigon on 9 February 1961.

References

Sources 

 
 
 
 
 
 
 
 
 
 

1889 births
1961 deaths
Hòa Hảo
People of the First Indochina War
Military personnel of the Vietnam War
Vietnamese generals
Vietnamese anti-communists